Fredrik Kiil (né Kristoffersen; 29 September 1921 – 25 December 2015) was a Norwegian physician, known for his improvements on the artificial kidney.

He was born in Narvik to Arne Kristoffersen and Marthea Kiil, and was married to physician Ragnhild Valberg. He died in December 2015.

Among his works is the thesis from 1958, titled The function of the Ureter and Renal Pelvis. He was awarded the Fridtjof Nansen Prize in 1974, the Jahre Prize in 1980, and the Dialysis Pioneering Award from the National Kidney Foundation in 1982. He was decorated Knight, First Class of the Order of St. Olav in 1990 and was a fellow of the Norwegian Academy of Science and Letters.

References

1921 births
2015 deaths
People from Narvik
Norwegian nephrologists
Members of the Norwegian Academy of Science and Letters